Takao Sawai (born 21 September 1940) is a Japanese equestrian. He competed in two events at the 1988 Summer Olympics.

References

1940 births
Living people
Japanese male equestrians
Olympic equestrians of Japan
Equestrians at the 1988 Summer Olympics
Place of birth missing (living people)